"Sergels torg" is a single by Swedish singer Veronica Maggio. It was released in Sweden as a digital download on 20 August 2013 as the lead single from her fourth studio album Handen i fickan fast jag bryr mig (2013). The song peaked at number 6 on the Swedish Singles Chart.

Music video
A lyric video to accompany the release of "Sergels torg" was first released onto YouTube on 21 August 2013 at a total length of three minutes and forty-nine seconds. An official music video was released on 25 September 2013. The video does not show the Sergels torg square in Stockholm of the song’s title but the singer alone at an abandoned resort.

Track listing

Charts

Weekly charts

Release history

References

2013 singles
Veronica Maggio songs
2013 songs
Universal Music Group singles
Songs written by Salem Al Fakir
Songs written by Magnus Lidehäll
Songs written by Vincent Pontare
Songs written by Veronica Maggio